The Boston Bar First Nation is a First Nations government in the Fraser Canyon region of the Southern Interior of the Canadian province of British Columbia.  Located near the town of Boston Bar, it is a member of the Nlaka'pamux Nation Tribal Council.

Other Nlaka'pamux bands belong either to the Nicola Tribal Association or the Fraser Canyon Indian Administration.

Chief and Councillors

Treaty Process

History

Demographics

Economic Development

Social, Educational and Cultural Programs and Facilities

See also

Thompson language

References

Indian and Northern Affairs Canada - First Nation Detail

External links
Boston Bar First Nation website

Nlaka'pamux governments
First Nations governments in the Fraser Canyon